Aníta Hinriksdóttir (born 13 January 1996) is an Icelandic middle-distance track athlete who specializes in the 800 metres. She won the bronze medal in the event at the 2017 European Indoor Championships and a silver at the 2017 European U23 Championships. Aníta set the Icelandic record in the 800 m of 2:00.05, and holds also six other national middle-distance records.

As a 16-year old, she placed fourth in the 800 m at the 2012 World Junior Championships before winning the event at the 2013 World Youth Championships and European Junior Championships.

Biography
Aníta was born in Reykjavík, Iceland. On 14 July 2013, she won the 800 m at the 2013 World Youth Championships in Athletics in Donetsk, Ukraine. On 20 July, she won the event at the 2013 European Junior Championships in Athletics held in Rieti, Italy. These achievements made her the first person to win gold medals at both the World Youth Championships and the European Junior Championships in athletics.

She then represented Iceland at the 2016 Rio Olympics in the women's 800 m event. Aníta set another Icelandic national record with a time of 2:00.14 but just failed to qualify to the semifinals.

International competitions

Personal Bests

Personal life
Aníta is the niece of long-distance runner Martha Ernstdóttir who competed in the women's marathon at the 2000 Summer Olympics.

References

External links

1996 births
Living people
Anita Hinriksdottir
Anita Hinriksdottir
Anita Hinriksdottir
Place of birth missing (living people)
Anita Hinriksdottir
Athletes (track and field) at the 2016 Summer Olympics
European Athletics Rising Star of the Year winners